On October 25, 1999, a chartered Learjet 35 business jet was scheduled to fly from Orlando, Florida, United States to Dallas, Texas, United States. Early in the flight, the aircraft, which was climbing to its assigned altitude on autopilot, lost cabin pressure, and all six on board were incapacitated by hypoxia, a lack of oxygen in the brain and body. The plane ran out of fuel over South Dakota and crashed into a field near Aberdeen after an uncontrolled descent. 

The two pilots were Michael Kling and Stephanie Bellegarrigue. The four passengers on board were PGA golfer Payne Stewart; his agent, and former Alabama football QB, Robert Fraley; president of the agency, Van Ardan; and Bruce Borland, a golf architect with the Jack Nicklaus golf course design company.

History of the flight
Note: all times are presented in 24-hour format. Because the flight took place in both the Eastern Time zone – Eastern Daylight Time (EDT) – and the Central Time zone – Central Daylight Time (CDT) – all times are given in this article in Coordinated Universal Time (which is indicated by the time followed by the letters UTC).

Departure

On October 25, 1999, a Learjet 35, registration  operated by Sunjet Aviation of Sanford, Florida, departed Orlando International Airport  at 13:19 UTC (09:19 EDT) on a two-day, five-flight trip. On board were two pilots and four passengers.

At 13:27:13 UTC, the air traffic controller from the Jacksonville Air Route Traffic Control Center (ARTCC) instructed the pilot to climb and maintain flight level (FL) 390 ( above sea level). At 13:27:18 UTC (09:27:18 EDT), the pilot acknowledged the clearance by stating, "three nine zero bravo alpha." This was the last known radio transmission from the airplane, and occurred while the aircraft was passing through . The controller attempted to contact N47BA five more times in the next  minutes, again with no answer.

First interception
About 14:54 UTC (now 09:54 CDT in the Central Time zone), a United States Air Force F-16 test pilot named Colonel Olson, from the 40th Flight Test Squadron at Eglin Air Force Base in western Florida, who happened to be in the air nearby , was directed by controllers to intercept N47BA. The F-16 pilot made a visual inspection of the Lear, finding no visible damage to the airplane. Both engines were running and the plane's red, rotating anti-collision beacon was on which is standard operation for aircraft in flight. Olson could not see inside the passenger section of the airplane because the windows seemed to be dark. Further, he stated that the entire right cockpit windshield was opaque, as if condensation or ice covered the inside. He also indicated that the left cockpit windshield was opaque, although several sections of the center of the windshield seemed to be only thinly covered by condensation or ice; a small rectangular section of the windshield was clear, with only a small section of the glare shield visible through this area. He did not see any flight control movement. At about 15:12 UTC, Olson concluded his inspection of N47BA and broke formation, proceeding to Scott Air Force Base in southwestern Illinois.

Second interception
At 16:13 UTC, almost three hours into the flight of the unresponsive Learjet, two F-16s from the 138th Fighter Wing of the Oklahoma Air National Guard, flying under the call-sign "TULSA 13 flight," were directed by the Minneapolis ARTCC to intercept the Learjet. The TULSA 13 lead pilot reported that he could not see any movement in the cockpit, that the windshield was dark and that he could not tell if the windshield was iced. A few minutes later, a TULSA 13 pilot reported, "We're not seeing anything inside, could be just a dark cockpit though... he is not reacting, moving or anything like that he should be able to have seen us by now." At 16:39 UTC, TULSA 13 left to rendezvous with a tanker for refueling.

Third interception and escort
About 16:50 UTC, two F-16s from the 119th Wing of the North Dakota Air National Guard with the identification "NODAK 32" were directed to intercept N47BA. TULSA 13 flight also returned from refueling and all four fighters maneuvered close to the Lear. The TULSA 13 lead pilot reported, "We've got two visuals on it. It's looking like the cockpit window is iced over and there's no displacement in any of the control surfaces as far as the ailerons or trims." About 17:01 UTC, TULSA 13 flight returned to the tanker again, while NODAK 32 remained with N47BA.

There was some speculation in the media that the fighter jets were prepared to shoot down the Learjet if it threatened to crash in a heavily populated area. Officials at the Pentagon strongly denied that possibility. Shooting down the plane "was never an option," Air Force spokesman Captain Joe Della Vedova said, adding that "I don't know where that came from."

Canadian Prime Minister Jean Chrétien authorized the Royal Canadian Air Force to shoot down the plane if it entered Canadian airspace without making contact. He writes in his 2018 memoirs, "The plane was heading toward the city of Winnipeg and the air traffic controllers feared that it would crash into the Manitoba capital. I was asked to give permission for the military to bring down the plane if that became necessary. With a heavy heart, I authorized the procedure. Shortly after I made my decision, I learned that the plane had crashed in South Dakota." Chrétien relates that Stewart was "an excellent golfer, whom I knew and liked very much."

Crash

The Learjet's cockpit voice recorder (CVR), which was recovered from the wreckage, contained an audio recording of the last thirty minutes of the flight (it was an older model which only recorded thirty minutes of audio; the aircraft was also not equipped with a flight data recorder). At 17:10:41 UTC, the Learjet's engines can be heard winding down on the CVR recording, indicating that the plane's fuel had been exhausted. In addition, sounds of the stick shaker and the disconnection of the autopilot can be heard. With the engines powered down, the autopilot would have attempted to maintain altitude, causing the plane's airspeed to drop until it approached stall speed, at which point the stick shaker would have automatically engaged to warn the pilot and the autopilot would have switched itself off.

At 17:11:01 UTC, the Lear began a right turn and descent. NODAK 32 remained to the west, while TULSA 13  broke away from the tanker and followed N47BA down. At 17:11:26 UTC, the NODAK 32 lead pilot reported, "The target is descending and he is doing multiple rolls, looks like he's out of control... in a severe descent, request an emergency descent to follow target." The TULSA 13 pilot reported, "It's soon to impact the ground; he is in a descending spiral."

Impact occurred approximately 17:13 UTC, or 12:13 local, after a total flight time of 3 hours, 54 minutes, with the aircraft hitting the ground at nearly supersonic speed and at an extreme angle. None of its components remained intact.

Passengers and crew 
In addition to Payne Stewart and three others, there were two pilots on board:

The 42-year-old captain, Michael Kling, held an airline transport pilot certificate and type ratings for the Boeing 707, Boeing 737, and Learjet 35. He also had Air Force experience flying the KC-135 and Boeing E-3 Sentry. Kling was also an instructor pilot on the KC-135E in the Maine Air National Guard. According to Sunjet Aviation records, the captain had accumulated a total of 4,280 hours of flight time (military and commercial) and had flown a total of 60 hours with Sunjet, 38 as a Learjet pilot-in-command and 22 as a Learjet second-in-command.

The first officer, 27-year-old Stephanie Bellegarrigue, held a commercial pilot certificate and type ratings for Learjet and Cessna Citation 500. She was also a certified flight instructor. She had accumulated a total of 1,751 hours of flight time, of which 251 hours were with Sunjet Aviation as a second-in-command and 99 as a Learjet second-in-command.

Investigation 
The National Transportation Safety Board (NTSB) has several levels of investigation, of which the highest is a "major" investigation. Because of the extraordinary circumstances in this crash, a major investigation was performed.

The NTSB determined that:

The Board added a commentary regarding the possible reasons why the crew did not obtain supplemental oxygen:

The NTSB report showed that the plane had several instances of maintenance work related to cabin pressure in the months leading up to the crash. The NTSB was unable to determine whether they stemmed from a common problem – replacements and repairs were documented, but not the pilot discrepancy reports that prompted them or the frequency of such reports. The report criticised Sunjet Aviation for the possibility that this would have made the problem harder to identify, track, and resolve, as well as the fact that in at least one instance the plane was flown with an unauthorized maintenance deferral for cabin pressure problems.

Aftermath 
Stewart was ultimately headed to Houston for the 1999 Tour Championship but planned a stop in Dallas for discussions with the athletic department of his alma mater, Southern Methodist University, about building a new home course for the school's golf program. Stewart was memorialized at the Tour Championship with a lone bagpipe player playing at the first hole at Champions Golf Club prior to the beginning of the first day of play.

At its center is a rock pulled from the site inscribed with the names of the victims and a Bible passage.

The 2000 U.S. Open, held at Pebble Beach Golf Links, began with a golf version of a 21-gun salute when 21 of Stewart's fellow players simultaneously hit balls into the Pacific Ocean.

In 2001, Stewart was posthumously inducted into the World Golf Hall of Fame.

On June 8, 2005, a Florida state court jury in Orlando found that Learjet was not liable for the deaths of Stewart and his agents.

Documentaries
The documentary series Mayday, also known by the titles Air Crash Investigation and Air Disasters, features this incident in the first episode of its 16th season. The episode, titled "Deadly Silence", was first aired on June 7, 2016.

See also 
 Bo Rein – another US sportsman who died in a similar aircraft accident
 2000 Australia Beechcraft King Air crash
 Helios Airways Flight 522
 2022 Baltic Sea Cessna crash

References

External links 
 National Transportation Safety Board Aircraft Accident Brief

Learjet aircraft
Aviation accidents and incidents in South Dakota
Accidents and incidents involving the Learjet 45 family
Aviation accidents and incidents in the United States in 1999
Decompression accidents and incidents
Edmunds County, South Dakota
Learjet crash
October 1999 events in the United States
Airliner accidents and incidents caused by pilot incapacitation
Airliner accidents and incidents caused by fuel exhaustion